Renae Lloyd (born 22 June 1987) is a Jamaican international footballer who plays for Boys' Town, as a midfielder.

Career
Lloyd has played club football for Boys' Town.

He made his international debut for Jamaica in 2012.

References

1987 births
Living people
Jamaican footballers
Jamaica international footballers
Boys' Town F.C. players
Association football midfielders
National Premier League players